Oscar Peterson and the Trumpet Kings – Jousts is a 1974 album by Oscar Peterson, consisting of duets with the trumpeters Harry "Sweets" Edison, Jon Faddis, Clark Terry, Roy Eldridge and Dizzy Gillespie. Peterson had recently recorded individual albums with each of the trumpeters, released as Oscar Peterson and Dizzy Gillespie (1974), Oscar Peterson and Roy Eldridge (1974), Oscar Peterson and Harry Edison (1974), Oscar Peterson and Clark Terry (1975), and Oscar Peterson and Jon Faddis (1975).

Track listing
 "Danish Pastry" (Oscar Peterson, Clark Terry) – 5:53
 "Crazy Rhythm" (Irving Caesar, Roger Wolfe Kahn, Joseph Meyer) – 5:34
 "Stella by Starlight" (Ned Washington, Victor Young) – 5:58
 "Satin Doll" (Duke Ellington, Johnny Mercer, Billy Strayhorn) – 5:33
 "Oakland Blues" (Jon Faddis, Peterson) – 8:10
 "There Is No Greater Love" (Marty Symes, Isham Jones) – 4:47
 "Caravan" (Duke Ellington, Irving Mills, Juan Tizol) – 3:48
 "Makin' Whoopee" (Walter Donaldson, Gus Kahn) – 4:39
 "Trust in Me" (Milton Ager, Arthur Schwartz, Ned Wever) – 4:04

Personnel

Performance 
 Oscar Peterson – piano and organ
 Roy Eldridge – trumpet (tracks 2, 7)
 Harry "Sweets" Edison – trumpet (tracks 4, 8)
 Dizzy Gillespie – trumpet (tracks 3, 6)
 Jon Faddis – trumpet (track 5)
 Clark Terry – trumpet (tracks 1, 9)

References 

1974 albums
Oscar Peterson albums
Dizzy Gillespie albums
Jon Faddis albums
Roy Eldridge albums
Pablo Records albums
Albums produced by Norman Granz